Anna Valeriïvna Mishchenko (born 25 August 1983 in Sumy), is a Ukrainian middle distance runner who specializes in the 1500 metres.

Career
She won the 2006 Ukrainian national championships in the event. In 2008, she took sixth place in the European Athletics Indoor Cup in Moscow and represented Ukraine at the 2008 Summer Olympics. She reached the final of the 1500 m competition, finishing in ninth place with a personal best of 4:05.13.

She first won the bronze medal in the 1500 metres on the 2012 European Athletics Championships in Helsinki, Finland, subsequently upgraded to silver following the disqualification of winner Aslı Çakır Alptekin for doping offences.

On 25 February 2016, the IAAF announced, that she had been banned from competition for two years until 17 August 2017, and all her results since June 28, 2012 will be voided. This resulted from irregularities in her biological passport.

Personal bests

All information taken from IAAF profile.

References

External links

Living people
Sportspeople from Sumy
Ukrainian female middle-distance runners
Olympic athletes of Ukraine
Athletes (track and field) at the 2008 Summer Olympics
Athletes (track and field) at the 2012 Summer Olympics
World Athletics Championships athletes for Ukraine
European Athletics Championships medalists
Doping cases in athletics
Ukrainian sportspeople in doping cases
Universiade medalists in athletics (track and field)
1983 births
Universiade gold medalists for Ukraine
Medalists at the 2011 Summer Universiade
20th-century Ukrainian women
21st-century Ukrainian women